Rupam Kurmi (died 4 February 2004) was an Indian politician from the state of Assam. She was a former Minister for Employment and Craftsmanship in the Tarun Gogoi cabinet, and Member of Assam Legislative Assembly for Mariani. She is the mother of MLA, Rupyoti Kurmi.

References 

Assam MLAs 1991–1996
Assam MLAs 1996–2001
Assam MLAs 2001–2006
Assam politicians
2004 deaths
Women state cabinet ministers of India
State cabinet ministers of Assam
Indian National Congress politicians from Assam
21st-century Indian women politicians